Wat Woranat Banphot also colloquially known as Wat Khao Kob (วัดเขากบ) is an ancient Buddhist temple in Mahā Nikāya sect, regarded as one of the famous and well-known temples of Nakhon Sawan Province.

Description 
Khao Kob (frog mountain), the location of the temple, is regarded as the highest mountain in Nakhon Sawan. Hence the name "Wat Khao Kob".

This temple was built since the Sukhothai period by Lord Ban Mueang to dedicate to his younger brother, Lord Ram, who died in war.  At that time it was called "Wat Pak Phra Bang" (วัดปากพระบาง).

The temple has a replica of Lord Buddha footprint and a pagoda encasing the relic of Lord Buddha built since the Sukhothai period. It was praised by the Department of Religious Affairs as the best development temple of 1966.

One of the former abbots of the temple, Luang Phor Thong (หลวงพ่อทอง), a monk who was highly respected by both Nakhon Sawan residents and the general public. Originally, he was a monk traveling from distant Thung Yang, Uttaradit Province, he comes to live at the peak of the desolated Khao Kob annually. With his practice, he was widely revered. Therefore, he was invited to be the abbot of Wat Khao Kob.

He has developed the temple for more than 10 years until it has the condition it is today. In addition, he was also known for being a monk with miraculous powers. Rumour has it that he was able to miraculously disappear. Luang Phor Thong was an abbot for 45 years, and died in 1941 when he was about 80 years old. Until today, his sacred objects are still popular and discussed in the circle of Thai amulet collectors.

Tourism 
Khao Kob is regarded as a viewpoint of Nakhon Sawan City, from this point, tourists can clearly see the whole city of Nakhon Sawan, including Bueng Boraphet, a largest freshwater lake in Thailand or several mountains in adjacent district Phayuha Khiri.

Wat Woranat Banphot in the Wan Ok Phansa (Buddhist Lent Festival), is a venue where Tak Bat Thewo, a great merit-making tradition is held. The procession of monks will descend from the hill to receive alms of Buddhists as if descending from heaven.

References

External links 
Wat Woranat Banphot

Buddhist temples in Nakhon Sawan Province
Ancient monuments in Thailand
Tourist attractions in Nakhon Sawan province